This is a list of water polo players:

A 

 Johan Aantjes
 Kees van Aelst
 Viktor Ageev
 Milan Aleksić
 Erik Andersson
 Robert Andersson
 Vilhelm Andersson
 Dragan Andrić
 Dmitry Apanasenko
 Marko Avramović
 Tony Azevedo

B 

 Nils Backlund
 Ryan Bailey
 Veljko Bakašun
 Roman Balachov
 Maro Balić
 Samir Barać
 Thye Bezerra
 Gemma Beadsworth
 Marc van Belkum
 Stan van Belkum
 Tibor Benedek
 Ben Wharton Benedict
 Bouke Benenga
 Erik Bergvall
 Erik Bergqvist
 Wouly de Bie
 Péter Biros
 Alex Boegschoten
 Hellen Boering
 Ozren Bonačić
 Bart Bongers
 Karla van der Boon
 Arne Borg
 Zenon Bortkevich
 Miho Bošković
 Marko Brainović
 Mart Bras
 Pyotr Breus
 Bert Brinkman
 / Perica Bukić
 Ivan Buljubašić
 Jan Bultman
 Arie van de Bunt
 Damir Burić
 Andro Bušlje
 Ton Buunk

C 

 Naomi Castle
/ Givi Chikvanaia
 Izabella Chiappini
 Ivo Cipci
 Aleksandar Ćirić
 Murat Carak
 Murat Cakir
 Johan Cortlever
 Nikita Cuffe
 Miloš Ćuk
 Fran Čubranić
 Uroš Čučković

D 

 Dejan Dabović
 Teo Đogaš
 Fred van Dorp
 Dmitri Douguine
 Veselin Đuho
 Nikša Dobud

E 

 Eduard Egorov
 Karlo Erak
 Vice Erak
 Ed van Es

F 

 Pietro Figlioli
 Filip Filipović
 Rajmund Fodor
 Joanne Fox
 Tomislav Franjković
 Lex Franken
 Suzie Fraser
 Aleksandr Fyodorov

G 

 Serguei Garbouzov
 István Gergely
 Loet Geutjes
 Damir Glavan
 Živko Gocić
 Taniele Gofers
 Randall Goff
 Leri Gogoladze
 Vladimir Gojković
 Dmitry Gorshkov
 Boris Goykhman
 Igor Grabovsky
 Yury Grigorovsky
 Yevgeny Grishin
 Max Gumpel
 Bridgette Gusterson
 Nodar Gvakhariya
 Kate Gynther

H 

Ru den Hamer
Simone Hankin
Pontus Hanson
Robert Havekotte
 Zdravko Hebel
 Mithat Hantal
Anton Heiden
André Hermsen
Henk Hermsen
Wim Hermsen
Jan van Heteren
Amy Hetzel
Yvette Higgins
 Igor Hinić
Andy Hoepelman
Hans Hoogveld
Kate Hooper
 Norbert Hosnyánszky
Jan Hulswit

I 

Iouri Iatsev
 Danilo Ikodinović
Koos Issard
 Vladimir Ivković

J 

 Zoran Janković
 Mlađan Janović
 Nikola Janović
John Jansen
 Viktor Jelenić
 Zdravko Ježić
 Predrag Jokić
 Maro Joković
Frank Jordan
 Dragan Jovanović
Harald Julin

K 

Aleksandr Kabanov
 Hrvoje Kačić
Anatoly Kartashov
 Tamás Kásás
Giorgos Katsaounis
 Danny Kayes
 Gábor Kis
 Gergely Kiss
Ben Kniest
Bronwen Knox
Emma Knox
Koos Köhler
Sushil Kohli
Aleksandr Kolotov
 Cem Kurt
 Andrija Komadina
Jan Jaap Korevaar
 Miloš Korolija
Zoltan Kosz
Sergey Kotenko
 Zdravko-Ćiro Kovačić
Andriy Kovalenko
Nikolay Kozlov
Evert Kroon
 Nikola Kuljača
Torsten Kumfeldt
Vyacheslav Kurennoy
  Ivica Kurtini
Nikolay Kuznetsov
Vladimir Kuznetsov

L 

Nico Landeweerd
 Dejan Lazović
Gijs van der Leden
Bram Leenards
Cornelis Leenheer
Ingrid Leijendekker
Patricia Libregts
 Kristian Lipar
 Luka Lončar
 Ronald Lopatni
 Deni Lušić

M 

Hans Maier
 Norbert Madaras
 Dušan Mandić
Tamás Marcz
Boris Markarov
 Uroš Marović
Nikolai Maximov
 Callum Maxwell
Harry van der Meer
Eduard Meijer
Karel Meijer
Nikolai Melnikov
Nurlan Mendygaliev
Aad van Mil
 Kristijan Milaković
 Igor Milanović
Marc Minguell
Ruud Misdorp
 Branislav Mitrović
 Stefan Mitrović
 Tamás Molnár
Ad Moolhuijzen
 Matthew Morris
P'et're Mshveniyeradze
Hans Muller
 Milan Muškatirović
 Petar Muslim

N 

Theodor Nauman
Sergey Naumov
 Antun Nardeli
Hans Nieuwenburg
Dick Nieuwenhuizen
 Slobodan Nikić
 Franjo Nonković
Eric Noordegraaf
Roald van Noort
Moriah van Norman
Vladimir Novikov

O 

 Paulo Obradović
 Serdar Ozer
Abraham van Olst
Piet Ooms
 Huseyin Ozfer
Soesoe van Oostrom Soede

P 

 Lovro Paparić
 Josip Pavić
Hans Parrel
 Branko Peković
 Đorđe Perišić
Felipe Perrone
 Zoran Petrović
 Felipe Perrone
Remco Pielstroom
 Duško Pijetlović
 Gojko Pijetlović
 Miroslav Poljak
 Dušan Popović
 Andrija Prlainović
Boris Popov
Valentin Prokopov

R 

 Marko Radulović
 Nikola Rađen
 Goran Rađenović
 Lovro Radonjić
Gé Regter
Andrei Reketchinski
Joop Rohner
Ravindra Dhuri
 Vinko Rosić
Ratko Rudić
Johan Rühl
Frits Ruimschotel
Axel Runström
Mikhail Ryzhak

S 

 Piet Salomons
 Yevgeny Saltsyn
 Mirko Sandić
 Aleksa Šaponjić
 Aleksandar Šapić
 Dejan Savić
 John Scherrenburg
 Wim van de Schilde
 Ton Schmidt
 Jan Scholte
 Suhan Selduz
 Hakan Solicikoglu
 Saygun Selduz
 Richard Sneddon
/ Denis Šefik
 Vladimir Semyonov
 Yevgeny Sharonov
 Yury Shlyapin
 Dubravko Šimenc
 Zlatko Šimenc
 Hans Smits
 Slobodan Soro
 Aleksandar Šoštar
 Wim van Spingelen
 Marin Šparada
 Toni Šparada
 Ivo Štakula
 Hans Stam
 Božidar Stanišić
 Barnabás Steinmetz
 Karlo Stipanić
 Nenad Stojčić
 Dmitri Stratan
 Gijze Stroboer
 Goran Sukno
 Sandro Sukno
 Zoltán Szécsi
 Bulcsu Szekely

T 

 Revaz Tchomakhidze
 Rik Toonen
 Petar Trbojević
 Ivo Trumbić
 Tamer Turan

U 

 Vanja Udovičić
 Veljko Uskoković

V 

 Dániel Varga
 Dénes Varga
 Tamás Varga
 Zsolt Varga (born 1972)
 Zsolt Varga (born 1978)
 Attila Vári
 Jugoslav Vasović
 Herman Veenstra
 Jan Evert Veer
 Frano Vićan
 Nico van der Voet
 Harry Vriend
 Wim Vriend
 Feike de Vries
 Jan-Lodewijk de Vries
 Josip Vrlić
 Mislav Vrlić
 Vladimir Vujasinović
 Nenad Vukanić
 Boško Vuksanović
 Božo Vuletić

W 

 Jan Wagenaar
 Gunnar Wennerström
 Wolf Wigo
 Joop van Woerkom
 Gerrit Wormgoor
 Hans Wouda

Y 

 Yuri Yatsev
 Alexander Yerishev
 Vitaly Yurchik

Z 

 Marat Zakirov
 Hans van Zeeland
 Predrag Zimonjić
 Irek Zinnourov
 Boris Zloković
 Marijan Žužej
 Piet de Zwarte

 
Water polo players